Far-far (also fryum or bobby) is an Indian snack food composed primarily of potato starch and tinted sago. They may also contain tapioca and wheat flour. Far-far puff up instantly when deep fried, and they are either eaten as a snack or served like a papadum to accompany a meal. They come in a variety of colors and shapes such as stars, hollow tubes, and flat squares, gears, aeroplanes and different animals shapes.

See also
 List of Indian snack foods
 List of deep fried foods
 List of potato dishes

References 

Indian vegetable dishes
Vegetarian dishes of India
Deep fried foods
Potato dishes
Indian snack foods